Segawa Sulaiman (commonly known as The Technician) (born May 22, 1991) is a Ugandan born-America based Olympic athlete and professional boxer. He has a southpaw style of fighting.  He made his professional debut on 21 April  2013 at the age of 21.

As of September 2021, he is ranked 99 out of 1547  best pro-boxer in the world according to BoxRec. Segawa holds the 2019 National Boxing Association Intercontinental Champion title. While in the Netherlands he adopted a Dutch style approach of kickboxing.

Early career
He was born on 22 May 1991 in Kampala, Uganda. 
In 2014, Segawa was recruited by UK-based Atlantic Entertainment. He had over 240 amateur fights.

Professional career
His professional career began on 21 April 2013,  when he won four round bouts fighting  with Armstrong Mwanje. The fight was held at Sabrina`s Pub in Kampala.  From 2015 to 2017, Sula  was based in Team Holzken, Harleem  in the Netherlands training and fighting kickboxing.  While in Netherlands,  he made a winning debut  against Djiby Diagne,  the fight took place at  Theater de Borenburg, Voerendaal on 14th January 2017.   In 2018, Sula transferred to  USA.

PersonalLife
Currently, Segawa is based in Silver Spring, Maryland, USA where he doubles as a fighter and a trainer at  Urban Boxing DC.

References

External links

https://www.aiba.org/african-olympic-qualification-tournament/

Living people
1991 births
Cruiserweight boxers
World Boxing Council champions
People from Kampala
Ugandan male boxers